Lewis Larsson (1881 - 1958), was born Hol Lars Larsson in Nås, Sweden, and served as the de facto head of the Photographic Department of the American Colony in Jerusalem, British Mandate Palestine. Larsson was renowned for his use of photojournalism to record and document the cultures of the south Mediterranean, primarily within the Palestinian region. Larsson was also a well respected diplomat of Sweden who acted as the vice consul and consul to Jerusalem and in that role acted in the best interests of the American Colony.

Early life
Lewis Larsson was the only son of Hol Lars Larsson and Israels Brita Ersdotter born in Nås, Sweden. His father died when he was only three years old and he was raised by his mother. He was one of five siblings, with the other four being his sisters, two born out of wedlock. In 1896, many of the residents of Nås emigrated, following the evangelist Olof Henrik Larsson, to the American Colony. This included Lewis and his family, and in 1896 they traveled mostly by train to Jerusalem in order to wait the "Return of the Lord" Lewis married Edith Larson, the daughter of the evangelist Olaf Larson.

Career with the American Colony

Photography
At the age of 16, in 1897, Lewis Larsson began studying photography under the guidance of Elijah Meyers, the founder of the photography department in the American Colony. In 1904, Larsson succeeded him as head of the department, which was becoming quite profitable.

Swedish Consul General and Vice-Consul in Jerusalem
Larsson took the position of Swedish Consul General to Jerusalem in 1921, succeeding Gustav Herman Dalman who served in that position from 1911 to 1914. The new position caused him to cut back on his photography work with the American Colony.

Later life

Photo gallery

See also
Najib Albina

References

Gröndahl, Mia. “To Jerusalem. In the Steps of Eight Swedes and a Finn”. PASSIA, 2009. P. 37-65.
Gröndahl, Mia. "The Dream of Jerusalem. Lewis Larsson and the American Colony Photographers." Journal, 2005. Award-winning book with 320 photographs.

External links

Library of Congress American Colony Exhibit Site

Swedish photographers
Photography in the State of Palestine
1881 births
1958 deaths
Early photographers in Palestine
Palestine ethnographers